Merrill Moores (April 21, 1856 – October 21, 1929) was an American lawyer and politician who served five terms as a U.S. Representative from Indiana from 1915 to 1925.

Biography 
Born in Indianapolis, Indiana, Moores attended the public schools, Butler University, and Willamette University.
He graduated from Yale University in 1878 and from the Central Law School of Indiana (now Indiana Law School) at Indianapolis in 1880.
He was admitted to the bar in 1880 and commenced practice in Indianapolis, Indiana.
He served as chairman of the Marion County Republican committee 1892–1896.

He served as assistant attorney general of Indiana 1894–1903.
He served as president of the Indiana State Bar Association and of the Indianapolis Bar Association in 1908.
He served as Indiana commissioner of the National Conference of Commissioners on Uniform State Laws 1909–1925.
He served as member of the executive council of the Interparliamentary Union in 1919.

Congress 
Moores was elected as a Republican to the Sixty-fourth and to the four succeeding Congresses (March 4, 1915 – March 3, 1925).
He was an unsuccessful candidate for renomination in 1924 and for nomination in 1926.

Later career and death 
He resumed the practice of law in Indianapolis, Indiana.
He served as vice president of the American Systems and Audit Co..

He died October 21, 1929, in Indianapolis, Indiana.
He was interred in Crown Hill Cemetery.

References

1856 births
1929 deaths
Willamette University alumni
Burials at Crown Hill Cemetery
Politicians from Indianapolis
Yale University alumni
Republican Party members of the United States House of Representatives from Indiana